Ian Donaldson Johnstone (2 March 1939 – 1993) was a Scottish footballer who played in the Football League as a forward for Colchester United.

Career

Born in Galashiels, Johnstone joined Scottish amateur club Ormiston Primrose as a youth, earning a move to Colchester United in the 1958–59 season. He played two games in the Football League for the U's, making his debut in a 1–0 home victory against Chesterfield on 18 April 1959 and made his final appearance on 29 August 1959 in a 2–2 draw with Barnsley at Layer Road. He later played for Clacton Town. Ian Johnstone died in 1993.

References

1939 births
1993 deaths
People from Galashiels
Scottish footballers
Association football forwards
Ormiston F.C. players
Colchester United F.C. players
F.C. Clacton players
English Football League players